The Martyrs of Persia under Shapur II were Assyrian Christian martyrs who were put to death by Shapur II of Persia (r. 309–379) for failing to renounce their faith. 
There may have been several thousand in total.
They are remembered as a group in the Roman and Orthodox calendars.
The Roman Martyrology gives feast days of 6 April, 22 April and 9 May for different groups.

Historical background

The standard view of early Christianity in Persia is that it was tolerated until Constantine the Great (r. 306–337) was converted to Christianity and made it the official religion of the Roman Empire.
Shapur II then became suspicious of Christians in his empire, and after being defeated in a war with Rome ordering that the Christian churches be destroyed and their clergy executed.
This was later extended to execution of all Christians.
This view is based on Syriac accounts of martyrdoms, but these may have been written some time after the events, and may present only the Roman viewpoint.

The theme of Shapur's persecution being a reaction to Constantine's conversion emerged only during the reign of Theodosius II (r. 402–450), and must be treated with some skepticism.
However, there is no doubt that Shapur II severely persecuted the Christians from 339 until his death in 379, and the 5th-century Syriac Passions most likely were the source for Sozomenos's account in his Ecclesiastical History, and have been carried forward into Greek translations.

Sozomen's account

Sozomen ( AD) wrote in his Ecclesiastical History, Chapter XIV - Conduct and martyrdom of Milles the Bishop, multitude of bishops slain in Persia by Sapor, besides obscure individuals,

Monks of Ramsgate accounts

The monks of St Augustine's Abbey, Ramsgate, wrote in their Book of Saints (1921),

Roman Martyrology

The Roman Martyrology includes:

Butler's account

The hagiographer Alban Butler ( 1710–1773) wrote in his Lives of the Primitive Fathers, Martyrs, and Other Principal Saints, under April 22,

Notes

Sources

 

 
 

Persian saints
4th-century deaths